Rush is a Kenyan television sitcom-soap opera that premiered on Maisha Magic Channel in 2014. It is created and executively produced by Lucy Chodota, the brain behind C-Through Production Ltd The series  topbilled by anchor, Janet Mbugua, Maryanne Nungo, singer-songwriter; Wendy Kimani and Wendy Sankale together with an ensemble cast. The series was concluded on May 29, 2015.

Plot 
Four cosmopolitan young Kenyan women: Pendo, Liz, Ruby and Zoe, are four mutual best friends, they engage in a tale of their personal life, likes, dislikes, their struggles in life and their love lives. Pendo Adama is the owner and chief-editor of "Rush Magazine". With her magazine she seeks to inspire and raise awareness on ways to tackle contemporary real life issues that affect the modern society like pride, marital challenges, motherhood, gender equity, promiscuity, sexuality, chauvinism and giving back to society among other young women and men in an African setting to lead a successful and lavish career and lifestyle.

Cast

Main cast 
 Janet Mbugua as Pendo Odama
 Wendy Kimani as Ruby Shama
 Maryanne Nungo as Liz
 Wendy Sankale as Zoe

Recurring cast 
 Ian Mbugua as Harrison 
 Patricia Kihoro as Nana
 Wanja Mworia as Doris
 Scolly Cheruto as Zizi
 Geoffrey Odhiambo as Eric
 Claude Judah as Teju
 Kevin Maina as Ken
 Jennifer Onyango as Dorcas
 Valentine Kamau as Joan
 Jamal Nassir as Charles
 David Gitika as Mr. Abas
 Joed Ngaruiya as Dominic
 Peris Wambui as Maxime
 Peter Kajairo as Rico
 Charles Ouda as Vince
 Eunice Ayuma as Annabelle
 John Wambugu as Melvin
 Abel Amunga as Morris

Awards and nominations

2015 Africa Magic Viewers Choice Awards

References

External links 

Kenyan television soap operas
Kenyan television shows
Kenyan comedy television series
2014 Kenyan television series debuts
2015 television series endings
English-language television shows
2010s Kenyan television series